Giovanni Michele Graneri (1708 in Turin – 1762 in Turin) was a painter of genre scenes or Bamboccio scenes. He was a pupil of Domenico Olivieri.

Among his works is the Lottery Drawing at Piazza del Erbe. This painting shows a crowded marketplace, as does his Market at Piazza San Carlo.

References

Painters from Turin
18th-century Italian painters
Italian male painters
Italian genre painters
1708 births
1762 deaths
18th-century Italian male artists